Dušan Mlađan (Anglicized: Dusan Mladjan, ; born November 16, 1986) is a Serbian–born Swiss professional basketball player who currently plays for SAM Basket of the Championnat LNA.

Professional career
On August 15, 2013, he signed with Radnički Kragujevac of Serbia for the 2013–14 season. 

In November 2014, he returned to Switzerland and signed with Lions de Genève. He left the club after two seasons, and in September 2016, he signed with Fribourg Olympic.

References

External links
Dušan Mlađan at aba-liga.com
Dušan Mlađan at eurobasket.com
Dušan Mlađan at legabasket.it

1986 births
Living people
ABA League players
Basketball players from Belgrade
Fribourg Olympic players
KK Radnički Kragujevac (2009–2014) players
Lions de Genève players
Lugano Tigers players
Pallacanestro Varese players
Pallalcesto Amatori Udine players
Roseto Sharks players
Serbian expatriate basketball people in Italy
Serbian expatriate basketball people in Switzerland
Serbian men's basketball players
Shooting guards
Sutor Basket Montegranaro players
Swiss men's basketball players
Swiss people of Serbian descent
Viola Reggio Calabria players